Margrave Rudolf III of Hachberg-Sausenberg (1343–1428) was the son of Margrave Rudolf II of Hachberg-Sausenberg and Catherine of Thierstein. He inherited Hachberg-Sausenberg when his father died in 1352. As he was a minor at the time, his uncle Otto I acted as regent. When Rudolf II came of age, he and Otto I ruled jointly, until Otto's death in 1384. Rudolf III is considered the most important of the Margraves of Hachberg-Sausenberg.

Reign

Construction activities 
Rudolf III initiated a number of construction projects. Two gatehouses, one large building and a tower were added to his residence Rötteln Castle in 1360. In 1387 and 1392, other large buildings were added. In 1401, he built a church in the village of Rötteln (now the Evangelical Church). In 1418, he expanded this church to the main church of his territory. Rudolf's tomb and the tomb of his second wife, Anna, both in this church, are considered major examples of Gothic art in the Upper Rhine.

Expansion of the country's sovereignty 
During his long reign, Rudolf was able to extend his country's sovereignty significantly:
 In 1365, he exchanged the village Huttinger against Höllstein (with the Bishop of Basel)
 In 1366, he received a share of Sausenberg from his uncle Otto I
 In 1368 he purchased the villages of Weil am Rhein, Wintersweiler, Welmlingen, plus some manors in Haltingen and the city and district of Otlikon from Knight Konrad of Münch. He also purchased Dossebach from William of Hauenstein and his son Henman of Hauenstein
 In 1394, Bishop Conrad of Münch, enfeoffed him with a fief in Breisgau
 In 1400, he purchased the Lordship of Neuenstein, including the villages of Gersbach, Schlechtbach, Raitbach, Kürnberg and Schweigmatt. Neuenstein Castle had been enfeoffed to the monastery of St. Blasien, but in 1401, the monastery renounced its rights on the castle.

Marriage and issue 
Rudolf III first married Adelheid of Lichtenberg and later Anne of Freiburg-Neuchâtel. On 13 February 1387, Rudolf closed a marriage contract with Konrad of Freiburg and Else of Neuchâtel for Konrad's 13-year-old sister Anna. Her dowry would be , in the form of the city and district of Sennheim valued at 7500 florins, Istein Castle, valued at 3000 florins, 1500 florins in cash, on the condition that he would use it to create manors in the area between Hauenstein, the forest and the mountains on both sides of the river, within one year after the wedding. With Anne, he had seven sons and six daughters. One son and three daughters fell victim to the plague in 1420. His son Otto (1388–1451) was Bishop of Constance from 1411 to 1434 as Otto III of Hachberg and was the host of the Council of Constance in 1415. As such, he was involved in the burning at the stake of the Czech reformer Jan Hus. The only other son to survive him, was the youngest, William, who succeeded him in 1428.

See also 
 Margraviate of Baden
 Baden
 List of rulers of Baden

References 
 Fritz Schülin: Rötteln-Haagen, Beiträge zur Orts-, Landschafts- und Siedlungsgeschichte, Lörrach 1965, p. 65.
 Fritz Schülin: Binzen, Beiträge zur Orts-, Landschafts- und Siedlungsgeschichte, Schopfheim 1967, p. 523-524 (genealogical tables of the House of Hachberg-Sausenberg).
 Karl Seith: Die Burg Rötteln im Wandel ihrer Herrengeschlechter, Ein Beitrag zur Geschichte und Baugeschichte der Burg, Röttelbund e.V., Haagen, undated, p. 6, according to Schülin in: Das Markgräflerland, vol. 3, issue 1, 1931
 Gerhard Möhring: Chronologie zu Markgraf Rudolf III. von Hachberg, Herr zu Sausenberg und Rötteln (1343-1428), in: Das Markgräflerland, vol. 1, p. 53-63, Schopfheim, 2001
 Regesten der Markgrafen von Baden und Hachberg 1050 – 1515, Baden Historical Commission, edited by Richard Fester, Innsbruck, 1892 online

Historical novel 
 Elke Bader: Anna von Rötteln — im Hagelsturm der Begierde, Jakobus-Verlag, Barsbüttel, 2008,  (this Anna von Rötteln is Anne of Freiburg)

External links 

 BrillOnline  Reference Works; Encyclopedia of the Medieval Chronicle

Footnotes 

Margraves of Baden-Hachberg
House of Zähringen
1343 births
1428 deaths
14th-century German nobility
15th-century German nobility

Gallery